Menefee Peak is a mountain summit in the southern San Miguel Mountains range of the Rocky Mountains of North America. Other surrounding mountain peaks include:  Flint Rock Point, Maggie Rock, Weber Mountain, Caviness Mountain, and Red Arrow Dome.

Mountain

Historical names
Menefee Peak
Menete Peak

See also

List of Colorado mountain ranges
List of Colorado mountain summits
List of Colorado fourteeners
List of Colorado 4000 meter prominent summits
List of the most prominent summits of Colorado
List of Colorado county high points
East Canyon Fire

References

External links

Mountains of Colorado
Mountains of Montezuma County, Colorado
North American 2000 m summits